Hanser Lenier Meoque Lugones (born October 24, 1987 in Pinar del Río) is an amateur Cuban Greco-Roman wrestler, who competes in the men's lightweight category (60 kg). He won a bronze medal in his division at the 2011 Pan American Games in Guadalajara, Mexico.

Meoque represented Cuba at the 2012 Summer Olympics in London, where he competed in the men's 60 kg class. He received a bye for the preliminary round of sixteen match, before losing to South Korean wrestler and former Olympic champion Jung Ji-Hyun, who was able to score nine points in two straight periods, leaving Meoque without a single point.

References

External links
Profile – International Wrestling Database
NBC Olympics Profile

1987 births
Living people
Olympic wrestlers of Cuba
Wrestlers at the 2012 Summer Olympics
Wrestlers at the 2011 Pan American Games
Pan American Games bronze medalists for Cuba
People from Pinar del Río
Cuban male sport wrestlers
Pan American Games medalists in wrestling
Medalists at the 2011 Pan American Games
20th-century Cuban people
21st-century Cuban people